Giovanni Giacomo Coleti or Coletti (2 May 1734 – 15 August 1827) was an Italian historian and philologist.

He was born in Venice. As a Jesuit, he studied in Piacenza and Bologna, having taught (from 1768) on the Jesuit college in Padua, where he collaborated with Daniele Farlati. After Farlati's death, Coleti continued to work on Illyricum sacrum which was left incomplete, from volumes V (1775) to IX. He also completed and published Illyrian martyrology (Martyrologium Illyricum, 1819). He also published several biographies and spiritual works.

He died in Venice.

References

18th-century Italian Jesuits
18th-century Italian historians
1734 births
1827 deaths
Writers from Venice
Italian philologists
19th-century Italian historians